Ghazi Hamoud Al-Obaidi (1944 - April 2007) was an Iraqi politician and a member of the regional leadership of the Arab Socialist Ba'ath Party, and was responsible for the organizations of Wasit Governorate. He was born in 1944 in Baghdad.

He assumed the position of Governor of Basra in 1980, then took over the position of Maysan Governor in 1983.

After the 2003 invasion
He was arrested during the invasion. However, in April 2005 he was released due to cancer.

Death
He died in April 2007 due to cancer.

References

External links

1944 births
2007 deaths
Members of the Regional Command of the Arab Socialist Ba'ath Party – Iraq Region
Most-wanted Iraqi playing cards